Nikhil Kumar (born January 1, 2003) is an American table tennis player. He competed in the men's singles event at the 2020 Summer Olympics held in Tokyo, Japan.

In 2019, he won the gold medal in the men's team event at the Pan American Games held in Lima, Peru.

References 

Living people
2003 births
American male table tennis players
Table tennis players at the 2019 Pan American Games
Pan American Games medalists in table tennis
Pan American Games gold medalists for the United States
Medalists at the 2019 Pan American Games
Olympic table tennis players of the United States
Table tennis players at the 2020 Summer Olympics
Sportspeople from San Jose, California
American sportspeople of Indian descent
21st-century American people